Movlid Khaybulaev (born October 16, 1990) is a Russian mixed martial artist currently fighting in the Featherweight division of the Professional Fighters League (PFL). A professional competitor since 2011, he has also competed in Fight Nights Global and ONE Championship.

Personal life 
Khaybulaev was born in the Republic of Dagestan, a republic of Russia situated in the North Caucasus region, along the Caspian Sea. Khaybulaev trains with former UFC Lightweight champion Khabib Nurmagomedov. Khaybulaev credits Nurmagomedov, as well as Nurmagomedov's father, Dagestan legend Abdulmanap Nurmagomedov, who passed away due to COVID-19 complications in 2020, with inspiring him to compete in mixed martial arts.

Movlid was born in Dagestan, and like most of his peers, he combined his studies at school with training. He started with freestyle wrestling, but later the attention of the teenager was attracted by combat sambo - in both disciplines the guy achieved serious success. At the age of 16, the athlete became the champion of the Southern Federal District in wrestling, and a year later, he secured the result at the Russian Championship.

After, Khaibulaev entered the branch of the Law Academy under the Ministry of Justice of Russia, located in Makhachkala, and in parallel with his studies, continued to win new awards. In 2009, again in the Southern Federal District, he took first place in the combat sambo championship, and after that he switched to mixed martial arts, and a new hobby opened up great horizons for him.

Mixed martial arts career

Early career 
In the same year, 2009, Movlid took part in the Dagestan Mixed Fight Championship and, having won another big victory, met Abdulmanap Nurmagomedov. Training under his supervision made it possible to expand the arsenal of techniques used, thanks to which, two years later, the fighter made his debut in the professional ring. His first fight took place under the banners of ProFC, and in the fight, which took place in the format of 2 rounds of 5 minutes, the newcomer defeated Rustam Akhmarov.

In December of the same year, "Killer" was sent to the MMA World Championship in Antalya, and he, being a 3rd year student, became a gold medalist there. After that, Khaibulaev got another victory among the pros and got the opportunity to fight in the Fight Nights league. The next three bouts took place there, moreover, successfully, and with short forays into other organizations, the Dagestani built a career in this promotion.

By 2017, Movlid had 11 victories in a row and did not know the bitterness of defeat. After a quick finish in a fight with Paata Robakidze, his representatives came to the management of One Championship, and organized a fight for him in Malaysia against Herbert Burns, who later signed a contract with the UFC. Despite the high-class BJJ of the Brazilian, the Russian easily translated him and did not let him breathe, due to which he won the match.

Then he returned to his homeland, fought for the last time in Fight Nights, defeating Ilya Kurzanov, and with such baggage, he signed a long-term contract with the PFL, becoming one of the featherweights of the Western organization.

Professional Fighters League

2019 Season 
During his May 2019 PFL debut at PFL 2 against Damon Jackson, he landed a flying knee strike which knocked out Jackson and ended the fight in 10 seconds. He continued his streak of wins (13-0-1) until his second fight with PFL at PFL 5, which ended in a majority draw against Andre Harrison.

During the 2019 Playoffs at PFL 8, Khaybulaev was knocked out by Daniel Pineda in 29 seconds of the first round. The result was later overturned to no contest after the Nevada State Athletic Commission suspended Pineda and fined him $12,500 after finding elevated testosterone levels from his bout with Khaybulaev on October 17, 2019.

After the 2020 PFL season was cancelled due to COVID, Movlid competed at UAE Warriors 14 on November 27, 2020 against Zaka Fatullazade, submitting him in the first round with a rear-naked choke.

2021 Season 
In 2021, Movlid competed in his second PFL season. At PFL 1 (2021), he beat Lazar Stojadinovic to secure three points in the regular season. On June 25, 2021 at PFL 6, Khaybulaev beat 2019 featherweight champion Lance Palmer to secure three more points, bringing his season point total to six, thus securing him as the fourth seed in the featherweight bracket.

On August 13, 2021 Movlid fought number one seed Brendan Loughnane in the 2021 PFL Playoffs at PFL 9 on August 27, 2021, edging out Loughnane with a split decision victory to clinch a spot in the 2021 PFL World Championships.

On October 27, 2021 at PFL 10, Movlid faced off against Chris Wade for the 2021 PFL featherweight world title. Khaybulaev outperformed Wade for 5 rounds and won via unanimous decision to win the PFL Featherweight title and earned a $1 million collective prize.

In March 2022, PFL announced on Twitter that Khaybulaev was injured and would not be defending his crown in the 2022 season. Loughnane, who lost the 2021 championship to Khaybulaev, lamented his inability to have a rematch with the champion, but admitted he was relieved not to have to fight Khaybulaev again.

2023 Season 
Movlid will start of the 2023 season against Ryoji Kudo on April 1, 2023 at PFL 1.

Championships and accomplishments

Mixed martial arts 

 Professional Fighters League
 2021 PFL Featherweight Championship

Mixed martial arts record 

|Win
|align=center|19–0–1 (1)
|Chris Wade
|Decision (unanimous)
|PFL 10 
|
|align=center|5
|align=center|5:00
|Hollywood, Florida, United States
|
|-
|Win
|align=center|18–0–1 (1)
|Brendan Loughnane
|Decision (split)
|PFL 9
|
|align=center| 3
|align=center| 5:00
|Hollywood, Florida, United States
|
|-
|Win
|align=center|17–0–1 (1)
|Lance Palmer
|Decision (unanimous)
|PFL 6
|
|align=center|3
|align=center|5:00
|Atlantic City, New Jersey, United States
|
|-
|Win
|align=center|16–0–1 (1)
|Lazar Stojadinovic
|Decision (unanimous)
|PFL 1
|
|align=center|3
|align=center|5:00
|Atlantic City, New Jersey, United States
|
|-
|Win
|align=center|15–0–1 (1)
|Zaka Fatullazade
|Submission (rear-naked choke)
|UAE Warriors 14
|
|align=center| 1
|align=center| 1:06
|Abu Dhabi, United Arab Emirates
|
|-
| NC
|align=center|14–0–1 (1)
|Daniel Pineda
|NC (overturned by NSAC)
|PFL 8
|
|align=center| 1
|align=center| 0:29
|Las Vegas, Nevada, United States
|
|-
| Draw
|align=center|14–0–1
|Andre Harrison
|Draw (majority)
|PFL 5
|
|align=center| 3
|align=center| 5:00
|Atlantic City, New Jersey, United States
|
|-
| Win
|align=center|14–0
|Damon Jackson
|KO (flying knee)
|PFL 2
|
|align=center| 1
|align=center| 0:10
|Uniondale, New York, United States
|
|-
| Win
|align=center|13–0
|Ilya Kurzanov
|Decision (unanimous)
|Fight Nights Global 77 
|
|align=center| 3
|align=center| 5:00
|Surgut, Russia
|
|-
| Win
|align=center|12–0
|Herbert Burns
|Decision (unanimous)
|ONE: Throne of Tigers
|
|align=center| 3
|align=center| 5:00
|Kuala Lumpur, Malaysia
|
|-
| Win
|align=center|11–0
|Paata Robakidze
|Submission (guillotine choke)
|Fight Nights Global 53: Day 2 
|
|align=center| 1
|align=center| 1:13
|Moscow, Russia
|
|-
| Win
|align=center|10–0
|Vugar Bakhshiev
|TKO (elbows)
|Fight Nights Global 48 
|
|align=center| 3
|align=center| 3:47
|Moscow, Russia
|
|-
| Win
|align=center|9–0
|Alexander Panasyuk
|TKO (punches)
|Formula Fight Championship 5 
|
|align=center| 1
|align=center| 2:12
|Moscow, Russia
|
|-
| Win
|align=center| 8–0
|Ruslan Yamanbaev
|Decision (unanimous)
|Fight Nights Global 44 
|
|align=center| 3
|align=center| 5:00
|Moscow, Russia
|
|-
| Win
|align=center| 7–0
|Vladimir Egoyan
|TKO (flying knee)
|Fight Nights Global 41
|
|align=center| 1
|align=center| 2:04
|Makhachkala, Russia
|
|-
| Win
|align=center| 6–0
|Alexander Panasyuk
|KO (punches)
|Astrakhan MMA Federation
|
|align=center| 1
|align=center| 1:36
|Astrakhan, Russia
|
|-
| Win
|align=center| 5–0
|Dmitriy Korobeynikov
|TKO (punches)
|Fight Nights Global 33
|
|align=center| 2
|align=center| 4:13
|Moscow, Russia
|
|-
| Win
|align=center| 4–0
|Ilya Kurzanov
|Decision (split)
|Fight Nights Global 27
|
|align=center| 2
|align=center| 5:00
|Moscow, Russia
|
|-
| Win
|align=center| 3–0
|Abdul-Rakhman Dudaev
|Decision (unanimous)
|Fight Nights Global 26
|
|align=center| 2
|align=center| 5:00
|Moscow, Russia
|
|-
| Win
|align=center| 2–0
|Akhal Aliev
|Decision (unanimous)
|Dictator Fighting Championship 1 
|
|align=center| 2
|align=center| 5:00
|Moscow, Russia
|
|-
| Win
|align=center| 1–0
|Rustam Akhmarov
|Decision (unanimous)
|ProFC 36
|
|align=center| 2
|align=center| 5:00
|Khasavyurt, Russia
|

See also
 List of current PFL fighters
 List of male mixed martial artists
 List of undefeated mixed martial artists

References

External links
 

Living people
1990 births
Russian male mixed martial artists
Featherweight mixed martial artists
PFL male fighters